Symphyotrichum peteroanum (formerly Aster peteroanus) is a species of flowering plant in the family Asteraceae endemic to Argentina and Chile.

Citations

References

peteroanum
Flora of Argentina
Flora of Chile
Plants described in 1894
Taxa named by Rodolfo Amando Philippi